Mian Channu, alternately spelled Mian Chunnun, is the capital city of Mian Channu Tehsil in Khanewal District, Punjab province of Pakistan.

Etymology 
The city was named after a Sufi saint, Baba Mian Channu, who had lived there at one point. After his death, he was buried there. There is an urban legend about the name; it is believed that during the British rule, administration attempted to change the name of the city. They painted all boards with the new name. However, an unknown vandal changed the boards back to the original name. They tried repeatedly in vain, and since then, the name of the city remained 'Mian Channu'.

Mian Channu has many services and areas for its inhabitants, as well as tourists, such as educational institutions, a medical unit, a railway station, a fruit mandi, a park, and a public library. A mosque, temple, and gurdwara was built to perform religious services for all communities.

History 
In the year 1919, Mian Channu was considered a village, and by 1938, it was considered a town. Its limits were last extended in the year 1950. Since then, no extension has been made, and the development of the town from 1947 to 1961 remained slow. A municipal council was established in 1975, as it had grown into small urban centre by that time. After that, the town began developing, and major growth has been taking place, from 1972 to 1984. The trend of growth in this period has largely been along G.T Road, and in the northern direction.

It has been the headquarters of the Mian Channu Tehsil of Khanewal District since 1985, and is administratively subdivided into three Union councils.

For more than a century, Mian Channu was part of Multan District. With the raising of status of Mian Channu to a tehsil headquarters, and the creation of Khanewal District on 1 July 1985, Mian Channu Tehsil became a part of Khanewal District.

In 2009, a bombing killed approximately 12 people.  

An accidentally fired BrahMos missile from India landed in Mian Channu in 2022, resulting in the 2022 India–Pakistan missile incident.

Demographics 
Mian Channu has approximately 90,130 residents per the 2017 census, and is located on the Grand Trunk Road (250 km South West of Lahore, and 1,050 km northeast of Karachi), and KLP (Karachi, Lahore, Peshawar) railway line.

Faisal Town, residential area

Economy 
The city is one of the major contributor to agricultural production. Cotton, wheat, and mangoes are the major agricultural products. Major crops of the town are wheat, grain, peas, barley are the important crops of Rabi season, while Kharif crops are cotton, sugarcane, jawar, bajra, oil seeds which are shipped by rail and road to other parts of the country.

The city is also known for their local specialty, Khushi Barfi, which is a kind of condensed milk.

Notable people
Arshad Nadeem - athlete (gold medalist javelin thrower)
Ayub Ommaya - Pakistani-American neurosurgeon (NIH USA)
Ghulam Haider Wyne - Pakistani opposition leader, former chief minister of Punjab province
Maulana Tariq Jameel - is a Pakistani Islamic television preacher, religious writer, scholar, and a member of the Tablighi Jamaat.
Iftikhar Thakur -  Pakistani actor and stand up comedian.
Rana Babar Hussain - Pakistani politician
Muhammad Waseem (cricketer) -is an Emirati cricketer who plays for the United Arab Emirates cricket team.
Aslam Bodla  - Pakistani politician, member of the National Assembly of Pakistan
Zahoor Hussain Qureshi is a Pakistani politician who has been a member of the National Assembly of Pakistan since August 2018. He was also made parliamentary secretary for Ministry of Power. He is MNA from Khanewal district.

References 

Populated places in Khanewal District